
Gmina Janowiec Wielkopolski is an urban-rural gmina (administrative district) in Żnin County, Kuyavian-Pomeranian Voivodeship, in north-central Poland.

Villages
Apart from the town of Janowiec Wielkopolski, Gmina Janowiec Wielkopolski contains the villages and settlements of Bielawy, Brudzyń, Brudzyń-Leśniczówka, Chrzanowo, Dębiec, Dziekszyn, Flantrowo, Gącz, Janowiec-Wieś, Juncewo, Kołdrąb, Łapaj, Laskowo, Miniszewo, Obiecanowo, Ośno, Posługowo, Puzdrowiec, Sarbinowo Drugie, Świątkowo, Tonowo, Wełna, Włoszanowo, Wybranowo, Żerniki, Zrazim and Żużoły.

Neighbouring gminas
Gmina Janowiec Wielkopolski is bordered by the gminas of Damasławek, Mieleszyn, Mieścisko, Rogowo and Żnin.

References
Polish official population figures 2006

Janowiec Wielkopolski
Żnin County